Boni Pueri is a Czech boys' choir founded in 1982, which has become one of Europe's most famous musical ensembles.

The choir
The Czech boys' choir Boni Pueri ("Good Boys") has held more than 2,500 concerts in North America, Asia, and Europe, produced thirteen recordings, and been invited to participate in various other recordings with Supraphon, EMI, BMG, and ArcoDiva. In addition, Boni Pueri has been featured on a number of television and radio broadcasts. The choirs are invited to perform regularly with eminent artists, including José Carreras, and with other important ensembles and orchestras around the world.

Boni Pueri is also a private music school with 350 students and since 2006 has been under the patronage of the Czech Ministry of Education. They are a cultural ambassador of the "European Federation of Choirs of the Union".

Concerts and tours
Boni Pueri has been privileged to perform in some of the world's great concert halls including Grace Cathedral in San Francisco, Winspear Centre in Edmonton, Alberta, Canada, the Tokyo Bunka Kaikan, Seoul Arts Centre, Concertgebouw in Amsterdam, De Doelen in Rotterdam, Basilica di S. Maria Maggiore in Bergamo, Italy, Meistersingerhalle in Nuremberg, and the Rudolfinum Dvořák Hall in Prague.

Festivals
The choirs have appeared at numerous international music festivals including The Prague Spring Festival (1994, 1995, 1998, 2004, 2005), Europalia (Brussels 1998), AmericaFest International Festival for Boys’ & Men’s Choirs (Minneapolis 1998, 2002), and Jeonju International Sori Festival (South Korea 2002). In July 2004, Boni Pueri became the first European organization to host the highly acclaimed World Festival of Singing for Men and Boys and did so again in 2008. Individual members of Boni Pueri are often invited to be soloists in other performances, including The Magic Flute at the Teatro dell'Opera di Roma in 2004.

Main projects
Boni Pueri performs frequently with the Czech Philharmonic Orchestra, including a notable performance of King Roger by Karol Szymanowski in 2007. In 2006, the choirs were invited to open the Orchestra's Choral Concert Series in Dvořák Hall.

Other important projects of recent years have included performances of Bach's St Matthew Passion, the Mozart Requiem, the Fauré Requiem, a theatrical staging of Hans Krása's Terezín children's opera Brundibár, and a premiere recording of music by the baroque composers Johann Caspar Ferdinand Fischer, Pavel Josef Vejvanovský, and Jan Dismas Zelenka. In 2003, Boni Pueri's recording of Zelenka's Sub olea pacis et palma virtutis received the prestigious Cannes Classical Award, and in 2004, their recording of Benjamin Britten's A Ceremony of Carols was named as the Recording of the Month.

Collaborations

Singers
 Christina Johnston
 Edita Adlerová
 Lívia Ághová
 Gabriela Beňačková
 Lucie Bila
 Markus Brutscher
 Jaroslav Brezina
 José Carreras
 Miro Dvorsky
 Peter Dvorský
 Markus Forster
 Karel Gott
 Simona Houda-Šaturová
 Noemi Kiss
 Ivan Kusnjer
 Štefan Margita
 Bobby McFerrin
 Eva Urbanová
 Leo Marian Vodička

Orchestras and ensembles
 Czech Chamber Philharmonic Orchestra
 Czech Philharmonic Orchestra
 Czech National Symphony Orchestra
 Philharmonic Orchestra Hradec Králové
 Deutsches Symphonie-Orchester
 Hradistan
 Münchner Symphoniker
 Musica Bohemica
 Musica Florea
 Prague Philharmonia
 Schola Gregoriana Pragensis
 The North Czech Philharmonic Teplice
 Prague Radio Symphony Orchestra
 The Prague Symphony Orchestra FOK
 VUS Ondras

Soloists and musicians
 Ales Barta - organ
 Jana Bouskova - harp
 Vaclav Hudecek - violin
 Hana Müllerova-Jouzova - harp
 Josef Suk - violin
 Pavel Sporcl - violin
 Jaroslav Tuma - organ, harpsichord
 Vaclav Uhlir - organ
 Daniel Wiesner - piano

Conductors
 Petr Altrichter
 Vladimir Ashkenazy
 John Axelrod
 Douglas Bostock
 Charles Dutoit
 Jaroslav Krcek
 Libor Pesek
 Frantisek Preisler jr.
 Vojtech Spurny
 Robert Stankovsky
 Leos Svarovsky
 Marek Stryncl
 Rastislav Stur
 Roman Valek
 Vladimir Valek

Actors
 Otakar Brousek Sr.
 Eva Hruskova
 Bara Hrzanova
 Jitka Molavcova
 Jan Preucil
 Bara Stepanova

References

External links
 
 Boni Pueri European website

Musical groups established in 1982
Choir schools
Choirs of children
National choirs
Czech choirs
Boys' and men's choirs
Music schools in the Czech Republic
1982 establishments in Czechoslovakia